The fifty-sixth session of the United Nations General Assembly opened on 12 September 2001 at the UN Headquarters in New York City. The session opened the day after the September 11 attacks which destroyed the nearby World Trade Center. The president was former Minister of Foreign Affairs of South Korea Han Seung-soo.

References

External links 

 Resolutions and Decisions adopted by the General Assembly during its 56th session

56
2001 in international relations
2002 in international relations
2001 in the United Nations
2002 in the United Nations